The 2006 Girabola was the 28th season of top-tier football in Angola. The season ran from 25 February to 26 November 2006. Sagrada Esperança were the defending champions.

The league comprised 14 teams, the bottom three of which were relegated to the 2007 Gira Angola.

Primeiro de Agosto were crowned champions, while Bravos do Maquis, Progresso do Sambizanga and Sporting de Cabinda were relegated. Manucho Gonçalves of Petro Luanda finished as the top scorer with 16 goals.

Changes from the 2005 season
Relegated: Académica do Lobito, Petro do Huambo, Sporting do Bié 
Promoted: Bravos do Maquis, Académica do Soyo, Benfica do Lubango

League table

Results

Season statistics

Top scorers

Hat-tricks

References

External links
Girabola 2006 standings at girabola.com
Federação Angolana de Futebol

2006 in Angolan football
Girabola seasons
Angola
Angola